University of the Rockies (now the University of Arizona Global Campus) was a private university in Denver, Colorado. It operated from 1998 to 2018 and offered graduate and postgraduate instruction in the social and behavioral sciences both online  and at its Denver Instructional Site.  The university's programs were organized into two schools: The School of Professional Psychology (SOPP) and the School of Organizational Leadership (SOL), offering masters and doctorate degrees as well as graduate level certificate programs. The university's parent organization, Zovio, is a for-profit higher education company based in San Diego, California.

History
University of the Rockies was founded on June 18, 1998, as the Colorado School of Professional Psychology (COSPP) in Denver, Colorado.  In 2007, Bridgepoint Education (now Zovio) purchased COSPP and changed the school's name to University of the Rockies. In 2012, the university opened a new location in downtown Denver, Colorado.  The larger space included more room for on-site instruction and the HLC granted approval for University of the Rockies to offer degree programs at the Denver Instructional Site in 2013.  In 2015, the HLC notified University of the Rockies that it would continue the university's accreditation, with the next Reaffirmation of Accreditation in 2024–2025.  On October 29, 2018, the university officially closed its doors when it completed a merger with Bridgepoint Holdings other institution, Ashford University, and brought all of its educational programs under the Ashford University brand. The university is now the University of Arizona Global Campus as part of the acquisition of Ashford University by the University of Arizona.

Academics
The university's programs were organized into two schools: The School of Professional Psychology (SOPP) and the School of Organizational Leadership (SOL), each offering masters and doctorate degrees as well as graduate level certificate programs. The university offers    Master of Arts degree  in Human Services,   Organizational Development and Leadership,  Psychology,  Education, and  Counseling. It also offers four graduate level certificate programs in Business Psychology, Criminology and Justice Studies, General Psychology, and Organizational Leadership.

Within each degree programs, students selected any of several  specializations.

Students  pursuing licensure as clinical psychologists enrolled in the PsyD, Clinical Specialization, which was only available on campus. This degree was tailored by  concentrations in Clinical Neuropsychology, Forensic/Correctional Psychology, Health Psychology, Marriage and Family Therapy, or Sports Neuroperformance

Accreditation and licensure
The university was regionally accredited by the Higher Learning Commission (HLC). Initial accreditation was granted by the Higher Learning Commission in 2003. The university was also granted Category I status as a degree-granting institution by the Colorado Commission on Higher Education (CCHE). The university was an associate member of the National Council of Schools and Programs of Professional Psychology. Its doctoral program in Clinical Psychology were not accredited by the American Psychological Association, and it was not registered with the Association of State and Provincial Psychology Boards. Accreditation with the HLC ended and licensure transferred upon their merger with Ashford University which was accredited by the Western Association of Schools and Colleges.

Campus
In 2012, the University of the Rockies opened a new location in downtown Denver, Colorado. The facility offers classroom space and a Student Resource Center for campus students. The university also operated the Rockies Counseling Center in the university's former location in Colorado Springs, Colorado. It was located within a historic red brick building that had served as a railroad depot; the Center closed in 2015.

Student life

Honor societies
University of the Rockies students  were eligible to participate in one of the university's academic honor societies, Golden Key International Honour Society and SALUTE Veterans National Honor Society. Golden Key International Honour Society recognizes academic excellence and encourages scholastic achievement among college students across all disciplines. SALUTE Veterans National Honor Society recognizes academically outstanding student veterans and military.

Diversity initiatives
Diversity initiatives at the University of the Rockies were driven by the President's Diversity Council, the Diversity Task Force, and the Faculty Diversity Council. Diversity awards and recognitions include:
 2014 - INSIGHT Into Diversity Magazine recognized UoR Vice Provost Dr. Amy Kahn as a Diversity Visionary with a lifetime achievement in diversity award 
 2014 - Profiles in Diversity Journal selected UoR Provost Dr. Tina Parscal as one of the Women Worth Watching 
 2013, 2014 - Profiles in Diversity Journal's Innovations in Diversity Award (Honorable Mention) 
 2013 - The Corporation for National and Community Service named University of the Rockies on the President's Higher Education Community Service Honor Roll 
 2012, 2013 - INSIGHT Into Diversity's Higher Education Excellence in Diversity (HEED) Award  
 2011 - Profiles in Diversity Journal selected Janet Brugger as one of the Women Worth Watching 
 2011 - Profiles in Diversity Journal's Diversity Leader Award 
 2010, 2013 - Colorado Springs Diversity Forum's Raising the Bar Award 
 2010, 2011 - Profiles in Diversity Journal's International Innovation in Diversity Award 
 2010 - Profiles in Diversity Journal selected UoR President Dr. Charlita Shelton as one of the Women Worth Watching 
 2010 - DiversityBusiness.com recognized UoR President Dr. Charlita Shelton with the 2010 Champion of Diversity Award

University of the Rockies Press
University of the Rockies Press published and disseminated books on clinical psychology, religion and spirituality, business and organizational leadership, and health and well-being. As of March 2015, there are seven published books under UoR Press.

Community relations
The university and its employees supported several volunteer efforts in the community and partnered with the American Red Cross of the Colorado/Wyoming Region, Book Trust, Boys and Girls Clubs of Metro Denver, Brain Tumor Alliance, Junior Achievement, and Mi Casa.

References

External links
 

Former for-profit universities and colleges in the United States
Universities and colleges in Denver
Defunct private universities and colleges in Colorado
Educational institutions established in 1998
1998 establishments in Colorado
Educational institutions disestablished in 2018